The men's triple jump was a track & field athletics event at the 1900 Summer Olympics in Paris. It was held on July 16, 1900. 13 athletes from six nations competed in the triple jump. The event was won by Myer Prinstein of the United States, the nation's second consecutive victory in the men's triple jump. Prinstein became the first, and through the 2016 Games, only, person to have won both the long jump and the triple jump. James Brendan Connolly took second, making him the first man to medal twice in the triple jump (he had won in 1896). Lewis Sheldon finished third, completing what would later be known as a medal sweep.

Background

This was the second appearance of the event, which is one of 12 athletics events to have been held at every Summer Olympics. James Brendan Connolly of the United States, the defending champion, was the only jumper to return after the 1896 Games. There was no favorite as "the event was rarely held at that time" and was not even on the original program.

Great Britain and Sweden each appeared for the first time in the event. France, Germany, Hungary, and the United States all appeared for the second time.

Competition format

There was a single round of jumping.

Records

These were the standing world and Olympic records (in metres) prior to the 1900 Summer Olympics.

(*) unofficial

Myer Prinstein set a new Olympic record with 14.47 metres.

Schedule

Results

Prinstein defeated the defending champion Connolly to win the second Olympic triple jump competition. Distances for most of the competitors are unknown, as are placings after sixth.

References

Sources
 International Olympic Committee.
 De Wael, Herman. Herman's Full Olympians: "Athletics 1900". Accessed 18 March 2006.
 

Men's jumping triple
Triple jump at the Olympics